Haney Place Exchange is a transit exchange in Maple Ridge, British Columbia, Canada. Opened on August 27, 2008, it is the easternmost major transit exchange in the Metro Vancouver area. Part of the TransLink system, it is home to routes serving Maple Ridge and Pitt Meadows, and routes to Coquitlam, the Township of Langley, and Braid station in New Westminster.

Structure and location
The exchange is located in downtown Maple Ridge on the south side of McIntosh Avenue between Edge Street in the west and 226th Street in the East.  It is next to Haney Place Mall, the Ridge-Meadows Royal Canadian Mounted Police, municipal hall, The ACT Arts Centre & Theatre, the Maple Ridge Leisure Centre, and numerous businesses.

Transit connections
Standard-sized diesel buses, longer articulated buses, and smaller community shuttle buses all use the Haney Place Exchange.

Bay assignments are as follows:

Notes

See also
List of bus routes in Metro Vancouver

References

External links
Haney Place Exchange map (PDF file) 

TransLink (British Columbia) bus stations
Maple Ridge, British Columbia